Delgatie Castle is a castle near Turriff, in Aberdeenshire, Scotland.

A castle has stood on the site of Delgatie Castle since the year 1030 AD, although the earliest parts of the castle standing today were built between 1570 and 1579.  Additional wings and a chapel were added in 1743.

The castle was stripped from the disgraced Henry de Beaumont, Earl of Buchan, after the Battle of Bannockburn in 1314 and given to Clan Hay (later to become the Earls of Erroll).  Mary, Queen of Scots, was a guest at the castle in 1562 after the Battle of Corrichie.

Like many castles, Delgatie is rumoured to be haunted.  A number of reports of a ghostly red-haired figure, supposedly one Alexander Hay, were made by soldiers posted there during the Second World War. The castle's information boards, mostly written by Captain Hay who restored the house in the 1950s, recount that the ghost was first seen when a body was found bricked up in a priest hole.

Architecturally, the castle consists of a keep, adjoining house and two later wings.  Notable features include a very wide turnpike stair and painted ceilings dating from the 16th century in two of the rooms, one dating from 1592, and the other from 1597. In many places may be seen the Hay family arms including the three cattle yokes which recall a farmer and his two sons who were instrumental in the defeat of a Danish raiding party at Cruden Bay. (See Clan Hay for more detail.)

Today, the castle and its gardens are owned by the Delgatie Castle Trust.  The castle, grounds and café are open to the public throughout the summer months and suites within the castle itself and a number of cottages on the estate are available to rent. There is also a popular fishing site on the river passing through.

Gallery

External links

 Delgatie Castle website

References

Castles in Aberdeenshire
Category A listed buildings in Aberdeenshire
Listed castles in Scotland
Historic house museums in Aberdeenshire
Reportedly haunted locations in Scotland
Clan Hay